The M51 Group is a group of galaxies located in Canes Venatici. The group is named after the brightest galaxy in the group, the Whirlpool Galaxy (M51A). Other notable members include the companion galaxy to the Whirlpool Galaxy (M51B) and the Sunflower Galaxy (M63).

Members
The table below lists galaxies that have been consistently identified as group members in the Nearby Galaxies Catalog, the survey of Fouque et al., the Lyons Groups of Galaxies (LGG) Catalog, and the three group lists created from the Nearby Optical Galaxy sample of Giuricin et al.

Other probable members (galaxies listed in two or more of the lists from the above references) include IC 4263 and UGC 8320. The exact membership is somewhat uncertain.

Nearby Groups
The M51 Group is located to the southeast of the M101 Group and the NGC 5866 Group. The distances to these three groups (as determined from the distances to the individual member galaxies) are similar, which suggests that the M51 Group, the M101 Group, and the NGC 5866 Group are actually part of a large, loose, elongated structure. However, most group identification methods (including those used by the references cited above) identify these three groups as separate entities.

See also
 Virgo Supercluster

References

External links

 M51 group, SEDS Messier pages

 
Canes Venatici